Naci Ünüvar (born 13 June 2003) is a Turkish footballer who plays as a winger for Turkish club Trabzonspor on loan from Ajax. He was included in The Guardian's "Next Generation 2020".

Club career
On 22 January 2020, Ünüvar played his first match with Ajax in the 2019–20 KNVB Cup, when he scored a penalty in a 7–0 win over Spakenburg. Hence, he became the youngest player to score during his official debut for Ajax, at age 16 years, 223 days.

On 30 August 2022, Ünüvar was loaned by Ajax to Trabzonspor in Turkey for the 2022–23 season.

International career
Born in the Netherlands, Ünüvar is of Turkish descent. He is a youth international for the Netherlands.

Career statistics

Honours
Netherlands U17
UEFA European Under-17 Championship: 2019

References

2003 births
People from Zaanstad
Living people
Turkish footballers
Dutch footballers
Netherlands youth international footballers
Association football forwards
OFC Oostzaan players
AFC Ajax players
Jong Ajax players
Trabzonspor footballers
Eerste Divisie players
Dutch expatriate footballers
Expatriate footballers in Turkey
Dutch expatriate sportspeople in Turkey